The 2022–23 Macedonian Second Football League is the 31st season of the Macedonian Second Football League, the second division in the Macedonian football league system. This is the first season since the league was returned to the united league format, for the first time since 2016–17 season. The season began on 20 August 2022.

Participating teams

League table

Results

Top scorers

See also
2022–23 Macedonian Football Cup
2022–23 Macedonian First Football League

References

External links
Football Federation of Macedonia 
MacedonianFootball.com 

North Macedonia 2
2
Macedonian Second Football League seasons
Current association football seasons